Corumbataia lucianoi is a species of armored catfish endemic to Brazil, where it is found in the Upper Rio Paraná basin, Goiás, Brazil.  This species grows to a length of  SL.

The fish is named in honor of Luciano de Souza da Costa e Silva, Gabriel de Souza’s brother.

References 

Otothyrinae
Fish of South America
Fish of Brazil
Endemic fauna of Brazil
Taxa named by Gabriel de Souza da Costa e Silva
Taxa named by Fabio F. Roxo
Taxa named by Camila S. Souza
Taxa named by Claudio Oliveira (scientist)
Fish described in 2018